Rutilus heckelii is a species of roach, a genus in the family Cyprinidae. This species occurs in freshened areas of Black and Azov Seas, entering the Don, Kuban, Dniepr, Dniestr and rarely Danube drainages.

Newer research however suggests that R. heckelii is part of a more widely distributed species of roach, whose range extends to Siberia. The proper name of that species is Rutilus lacustris.

In Russia, other countries of the former Soviet Union and parts of Eastern Europe, this and related species of roach are commonly air-dried and salted to create a popular beer snack, known as 'taran' or 'taranka', after the Russian word for this fish species, 'тарань'.

References

Cyprinid fish of Asia
Fish of Western Asia
Freshwater fish of Europe
Fish described in 1814
Rutilus